The 2016 Trofeo Faip–Perrel was a professional tennis tournament played on hard courts. It was the eleventh edition of the tournament which was part of the 2016 ATP Challenger Tour. It took place in Bergamo, Italy between 8 and 14 February 2015.

Singles main-draw entrants

Seeds

 1 Rankings were as of February 1, 2016.

Other entrants
The following players received wildcards into the singles main draw:
  Ruben Bemelmans
  Federico Gaio
  Gianluca Mager
  Radek Štěpánek

The following players received entry into the main draw as alternates:
  Marco Chiudinelli
  Peter Gojowczyk

The following players received entry into the main draw as a lucky loser:
  Salvatore Caruso
  Jan Šátral

The following players received entry from the qualifying draw:
  Grégoire Barrère
  Andreas Beck
  Nils Langer
  Dzmitry Zhyrmont

Champions

Singles

  Pierre-Hugues Herbert def.  Egor Gerasimov, 6–3, 7–6(7–5)

Doubles

  Ken Skupski /  Neal Skupski def.  Nikola Mektić /  Antonio Šančić, 6–3, 7–5

External links
Official Website

Trofeo Faip-Perrel
Trofeo Faip–Perrel